Tamkeen Akhtar Niazi is a Pakistani politician who was a Member of the Provincial Assembly of the Punjab, from May 2013 to May 2018.

Early life and education
She was born in September in Abbottabad.

She has earned the degree of Bachelor of Arts in psychology from Kinnaird College for Women University. She received a Diploma in Apparel Management from Southern Polytechnic State University.

Political career

She was elected to the Provincial Assembly of the Punjab as a candidate of Pakistan Muslim League (N) on a reserved seat for women in 2013 Pakistani general election.

References

Living people
Punjab MPAs 2013–2018
1956 births
Pakistan Muslim League (N) politicians